Ali Froede (born April 8, 1993) is an American field hockey player for the United States national team.

She participated at the 2018 Women's Hockey World Cup.

References

1993 births
Living people
American female field hockey players
Female field hockey defenders
People from Warrenton, Virginia
Miami RedHawks field hockey players
Pan American Games bronze medalists for the United States
Pan American Games medalists in field hockey
Field hockey players at the 2019 Pan American Games
Medalists at the 2019 Pan American Games
21st-century American women